Phillips County Courthouse may refer to:

 Phillips County Courthouse (Arkansas), Helena–West Helena, Arkansas
 Phillips County Courthouse (Colorado), Holyoke, Colorado
 Phillips County Courthouse (Kansas), Phillipsburg, Kansas